Mulhearn is an Irish surname. Notable people with the surname include:

Ken Mulhearn (1945–2018), English football player
Tony Mulhearn (1939–2019), English political and trade unions campaigner and politician

See also
 Darren Mulhearne (born 1973), Irish Gaelic football goalkeeper
 Mulhern

Surnames of Irish origin
Anglicised Irish-language surnames